Lamprosema salomonalis is a moth in the family Crambidae. It was described by Thomas Bainbrigge Fletcher in 1910. It is found on the Chagos Archipelago in the Indian Ocean.

References

Moths described in 1910
Lamprosema
Moths of Asia